HMS Gay Bombardier was a Gay-class fast patrol boat of the Royal Navy. She was built by Vosper, Portchester, and launched on 28 August 1952.  She was the second ship to be launched in her class.

Following her sale to a private individual, she was seized and confiscated by the Italian Customs service in the mid-1960s. Her eventual fate is unknown.

References

Gay-class fast patrol boats
Royal Navy ship names
1952 ships